Kreiensen is a village and a former municipality in the district of Northeim, in Lower Saxony, Germany. Since 1 January 2013, it is part of the town Einbeck.

Geography

It lies in southern Niedersachsen in the foothills of the Harz and Solling Mountains. On the north are the heights of the Helleberg, on the southwest the Hube, and on the northwest the Selter. The Gande, a northeastern tributary of the Leine, flows through the center of Kreiensen.

Religion
The Roman Catholic church building stems from 1967. The evangelical lutheran church was built in Nazi Germany in 1935 as one of a few examples of those times.

Transport

Kreiensen railway station is known as a railroad hub with five lines interchanging. In 1865, Altenbeken–Kreiensen railway was connected with Hanoverian Southern Railway that already existed. One year thereafter, Vienenburg–Goslar railway was connected. Between 1886 and 1889 a railway station building was constructed. Construction plans stemmed from Hubert Stier, then professor at the Royal College of Technology in Hannover. It is a brick building. Its outside walls are covered with clay tiles in ochre colour. Some spots are ornamented with terracotta reliefs. Remarkable reliefs are a Brunswick Lion and an eagle which represented Coat of arms of Prussia. These two reliefs refer to the fact that  in those days one railway line belonged to the Duchy of Brunswick whereas the other belonged to the Province of Hanover, both interconnecting in Kreiensen. In 2016, DB Station&Service sold that station building in an auction.

Kreiensen station is still a transfer site of Deutsche Bahn, NordWestBahn and Metronom Eisenbahngesellschaft.

Economy
For most of the 20th century, Kreiensen also served as an important logistic center for the Federal German Mail (Deutsche Bundespost). When the latter was privatized and the new Hanover–Würzburg high-speed railway was opened in 1991, Kreiensen quickly lost a number of jobs in both sectors.

References

Former municipalities in Lower Saxony
Einbeck
Duchy of Brunswick
Populated places disestablished in 2013